Mauricio Mazzetti (born June 18, 1986, in Córdoba, Argentina) is an Argentine football defender.

Mazzetti was first brought to Malta when he joined Qormi after having played with a host of clubs around South America, Europe, and the Middle East. He joined Birkirkara in January 2015, and was a scorer in their 2014–15 FA Cup Trophy win against Hibernians Paola, with the game finishing 2–0.

Mazzetti participated in Birkirkara's Europa League tie against West Ham United F.C. West Ham reportedly showed interest in the defender after his impressive display. After the match West Ham showed interest in Birkirkara's Mauricio Mazzetti, but then club president Adrian Delia commented that no formal offers had been made to Birkirkara.

Mazzetti was later released by Birkirkara in July 2016.

In December 2016, Mazzetti was reported to have joined Terengganu F.C. I, together with fellow Argentine Federico Falcone, a former Valletta F.C. striker in the Maltese Premier League.

References

External links
 youtube.com
 youtube.com
 Profile at BDFA 
 
 clarin.com

1986 births
Living people
Argentine footballers
Argentine expatriate footballers
Gimnasia y Esgrima de Mendoza footballers
Racing de Córdoba footballers
FC Emmen players
AEK Kouklia F.C. players
Universitario de Sucre footballers
Eerste Divisie players
Cypriot First Division players
Expatriate footballers in the Netherlands
Expatriate footballers in Bolivia
Expatriate footballers in Cyprus
Expatriate footballers in Malta
Association football defenders
Footballers from Córdoba, Argentina
Argentine expatriate sportspeople in the Netherlands
Argentine expatriate sportspeople in Cyprus
Argentine expatriate sportspeople in Malta
Argentine expatriate sportspeople in Bolivia
Argentine expatriate sportspeople in Peru